The County Street Historic District is a historic district roughly bounded by Acushnet, Page, Middle, and Bedford streets (both sides) in New Bedford, Massachusetts, USA.  The district was a fashionable residential area populated by the city's elite from 1780 to about 1890, and includes the city's major civic buildings, including City Hall, the public library, post office, and registry of deeds.  County Street, its major roadway, was first laid out early in the 18th century.

The district was added to the National Register of Historic Places in 1976.

See also
National Register of Historic Places listings in New Bedford, Massachusetts

References

Historic districts in Bristol County, Massachusetts
New Bedford, Massachusetts
National Register of Historic Places in New Bedford, Massachusetts
Historic districts on the National Register of Historic Places in Massachusetts